The XP-13 Viper was a prototype biplane fighter aircraft designed by the American company Thomas-Morse Aircraft Corporation. The airplane was delivered to the United States Army in 1929, but they did not adopt it.

Design and development

This aircraft was one of several B. Douglas Thomas designs built in hopes of a production contract from the Army, following the successful Thomas-Morse MB-3 of 1919. Financed by the company, and named the "Viper", it was officially purchased by the Army in June 1929 and designated "XP-13".

The XP-13 fuselage had a corrugated aluminum skin built over a metal frame; the flying surfaces were also metal-framed, but covered with the traditional fabric. While designed to use the 600 hp Curtiss H-1640-1 Chieftain engine, (a novel 12-cylinder two-row air-cooled radial with the rear cylinders directly behind the front cylinders rather than staggered as normal in a two-row radial) for which the XP-13 incorporated a complex system of baffles to direct cooling air over the engine, the engine simply would not stay cool enough, and in September 1930 it was replaced with a Pratt & Whitney SR1340C Wasp of 450 hp. Ironically, the lower-power engine actually resulted in a speed increase of 15 mph, at least partly because of the weight savings.

In the end, the Army decided against production, Thomas-Morse was acquired by Consolidated Aircraft, and the prototype was lost to an inflight fire.

Variants
XP-13
Prototype, serial number 29-453 with 600 hp (448 kW) Curtiss H-1640-1 Chieftain hex engine

XP-13A
The XP-13 modified with a 525 hp (391 kW) Pratt & Whitney SR-1340-C enclosed in a NACA cowling, along with a revised fin and rudder

XP-14
This designation was used for a proposed Curtiss version of the Viper with the Curtiss H-1640-1 Chieftain hex engine

Operators

United States Army Air Service

Specifications (XP-13 (Chieftain engine))

See also

References
Notes

Bibliography
 Dorr, Robert F. and David Donald. Fighters of the United States Air Force. London:Temple, 1990. .
 Gunston, Bill, World Encyclopedia of Aero Engines. London: Guild Publishing, 1986.

External links

 Berliner-Joyce XP-13 Viper
 National Museum of the USAF page, with photo

Thomas-Morse P-13 Viper
Biplanes
Single-engined tractor aircraft
XP-13
Aircraft first flown in 1929